John Millar (19 March 1866 – 15 May 1950) was a Progressive party and Liberal Progressive member of the House of Commons of Canada. He was born in Woodstock, Canada West and became a farmer and teacher.

Millar attended high school at Woodstock Collegiate Institute. He received a second-class teachers' certificate and became a schoolteacher in Ontario for three years and in Saskatchewan for five years. From 1901 to 1908, he was the first secretary of the Saskatchewan Grain Growers Association and in 1906 chaired the Royal Grain Commission.

Millar served as reeve of Indian Head, Saskatchewan from 1910 to 1913, then as its mayor in 1914.

He was first elected to Parliament under the Progressive Party banner in Qu'Appelle riding during the 1921 general election then re-elected in 1925. In the 1926 election, Millar was re-elected under the Liberal-Progressive party label. After this term, he was defeated by Ernest Perley of the Liberal party in the 1930 federal election.

References

External links
 

1866 births
1950 deaths
Canadian farmers
Canadian schoolteachers
Liberal-Progressive MPs
Mayors of places in Saskatchewan
Members of the House of Commons of Canada from Saskatchewan
Progressive Party of Canada MPs